Protected area Pliva, Janj with Janjske Otoke reserve are protected nature areas in Republika Srpska, Bosnia and Herzegovina. It covers the basin of the Janj river from Babići to the mouth in the Pliva river near Šipovo.

Janj forest was named as a UNESCO World Heritage Site in 2021, as an extension to the site Ancient and Primeval Beech Forests of the Carpathians and Other Regions of Europe, which is shared among 18 European countries.

References

World Heritage Sites in Bosnia and Herzegovina
Protected areas of Bosnia and Herzegovina
Protected areas of Republic of Srpska